Allas-les-Mines is a commune in the Dordogne department in Nouvelle-Aquitaine in southwestern France.

Population

History
In 1910, the commune of Allas-de-Berbiguières was renamed Allas-les-Mines.

Places and monuments 
Museum "La rue du temps qui passe" (Boom Collection), created in 2017: over 1,000 m2, reconstruction of an early 20th century street.

See also
Communes of the Dordogne département

References

Communes of Dordogne